The 2011 Hakkari attacks occurred on the night of October 19, 2011, when over 100 Kurdistan Workers' Party (PKK) fighters killed 26 Turkish soldiers in Hakkâri Province. It was allegedly the deadliest PKK attack on Turkish security forces since the Çewlik massacre in 1993 in which 33 unarmed recruits were killed. The PKK said the attack was to avenge a high-ranking PKK commander killed by Turkish operations in Iraqi Kurdistan earlier.

Turkish security forces claimed to have killed 49 PKK fighters in their retaliation during the following days, according to Turkish media.

According to claims made by Turkish authorities, the attack was carried out by the Syrian branch of the PKK, led by Dr. Bahoz Erdal.

References

Attacks in Turkey in 2011
2011 in Turkey
History of Hakkâri Province
Kurdistan Workers' Party attacks